Abrasion is the process of scuffing, scratching, wearing down, marring, or rubbing away.  It can be intentionally imposed in a controlled process using an abrasive. Abrasion can be an undesirable effect of exposure to normal use or exposure to the elements.

In stone shaping
Ancient artists, working in stone, used abrasion to create sculptures. The artist selected dense stones like carbonite and emery and rubbed them consistently against comparatively softer stones like limestone and granite. The artist used different sizes and shapes of abrasives, or turned them in various ways as they rubbed, to create effects on the softer stone's surface. Water was continuously poured over the surface to carry away particles. Abrasive technique in stone shaping was a long, tedious process that, with patience, resulted in eternal works of art in stone.

Models
The Archard equation is a simple model used to describe sliding wear and is based on the theory of asperity contact.

where:

 Q is the total volume of wear debris produced
 K is the wear coefficient
 W is the total normal load
 L is the sliding distance
 H is the hardness of the softest contacting surfaces

K is obtained from experimental results and depends on several parameters. Among them are surface quality, chemical affinity between the material of two surfaces, surface hardness process, heat transfer between two surfaces and others.

Abrasion resistance
The resistance of materials and structures to abrasion can be measured by a variety of test methods. These often use a specified abrasive or other controlled means of abrasion.  Under the conditions of the test, the results can be reported or can be compared items subjected to similar tests. 

Such standardized measurements can produce two quantities: abrasion rate and normalized abrasion rate (also called abrasion resistance index). The former is the amount of mass lost per 1000 cycles of abrasion. The latter is the ratio of former with the known abrasion rate for some specific reference material.

One type of instrument used to get the abrasion rate and normalized abrasion rate is the abrasion scrub tester, which is made up of a mechanical arm, liquid pump, and programmable electronics. The machine draws the mechanical arm with attached brush (or sandpaper, sponge, etc.) over the surface of the material that is being tested. The operator sets a pre-programmed number of passes for a repeatable and controlled result. The liquid pump can provide detergent or other liquids to the mechanical arm during testing to simulate washing and other normal uses.

The use of proper lubricants can help control abrasion in some instances.  Some items can be covered with an abrasion-resistant material.  Controlling the cause of abrasion is sometimes an option.

Standards

ASTM
 ASTM B611 Test Method for Abrasive Wear Resistance of Cemented Carbides
 ASTM C131 Standard Test Method for Resistance to Degradation of Small-Size Coarse Aggregate by Abrasion and Impact in the Los Angeles Machine
 ASTM C448 Standard Test Methods for Abrasion Resistance of Porcelain Enamels
 ASTM C535 Standard Test Method for Resistance to Degradation of Large-Size Coarse Aggregate by Abrasion and Impact in the Los Angeles Machine
 ASTM C944 Standard Test Method for Abrasion Resistance of Concrete or Mortar Surfaces by the Rotating-Cutter Method
 ASTM C1027 Standard Test Method for Determining Visible Abrasion Resistance of Glazed Ceramic Tile
 ASTM C1353 Standard Test Method for Abrasion Resistance of Dimension Stone Subjected to Foot Traffic Using a Rotary Platform, Double-Head Abraser
 ASTM D968 Standard Test Methods for Abrasion Resistance of Organic Coatings by Falling Abrasive
 ASTM D1630 Standard Test Method for Rubber Property — Abrasion Resistance (Footwear Abrader)
 ASTM D2228 Standard Test Method for Rubber Property - Relative Abrasion Resistance by the Pico Abrader Method
 ASTM D3389 Standard Test Method for Coated Fabrics Abrasion Resistance (Rotary Platform Abrader)
 ASTM D4060 Standard Test Method for Abrasion Resistance of Organic Coatings by the Taber Abraser
 ASTM D4158 Standard Guide for Abrasion Resistance of Textile Fabrics],
 ASTM D4966 Standard Test Method for Abrasion Resistance of Textile Fabrics
 ASTM D5181 Standard Test Method for Abrasion Resistance of Printed Matter by the GA-CAT Comprehensive Abrasion Tester
 ASTM D5264 Standard Practice for Abrasion Resistance of Printed Materials by the Sutherland Rub Tester
 ASTM D5963 Standard Test Method for Rubber Property—Abrasion Resistance (Rotary Drum Abrader)
 ASTM D6279 Standard Test Method for Rub Abrasion Mar Resistance of High Gloss Coatings
 ASTM D7428 Standard Test Method for Resistance of Fine Aggregate to Degradation by Abrasion in the Micro-Deval Apparatus
 ASTM F1486 Standard Practice for Determination of Abrasion and Smudge Resistance of Images Produced from Office Products
ASTM F1978 Standard Test Method for Measuring Abrasion Resistance of Metallic Thermal Spray Coatings by Using the Taber Abraser
 ASTM G56 Standard Test Method for Abrasiveness of Ink-Impregnated Fabric Printer Ribbons and Other Web Materials
 ASTM G65 Standard Test Method for Measuring Abrasion Using the Dry Sand/Rubber Wheel Apparatus
 ASTM G75 Standard Test Method for Determination of Slurry Abrasivity (Miller Number) and Slurry Abrasion Response of Materials (SAR Number)
 ASTM G81 Standard Test Method for Jaw Crusher Gouging Abrasion Test
ASTM G99 Standard Test Method for Wear Testing with a Pin-on-Disk Apparatus
 ASTM G105 Standard Test Method for Conducting Wet Sand/Rubber Wheel Abrasion Tests
 ASTM G132 Standard Test Method for Pin Abrasion Testing
 ASTM G171 Standard Test Method for Scratch Hardness of Materials Using a Diamond Stylus
 ASTM G174 Standard Test Method for Measuring Abrasion Resistance of Materials by Abrasive Loop Contact

DIN
 DIN 53516 Testing of Rubber and Elastomers; Determination of Abrasion Resistance

ISO
 ISO 4649 Rubber, vulcanized or thermoplastic -- Determination of abrasion resistance using a rotating cylindrical drum device
 ISO 9352 Plastics -- Determination of resistance to wear by abrasive wheels
 ISO 28080 Hardmetals -- Abrasion tests for hardmetals
 ISO 23794 Rubber, vulcanized or thermoplastic -- Abrasion testing -- Guidance
 ISO 21988:2006 Abrasion-resistant cast irons. Classification
 ISO 28080:2011 Hardmetals. Abrasion tests for hardmetals
 ISO 16282:2008 Methods of test for dense shaped refractory products. Determination of resistance to abrasion at ambient temperature

JSA
 JIS A 1121 Method of test for resistance to abrasion of coarse aggregate by use of the Los Angeles machine
 JIS A 1452 Method of abrasion test for building materials and part of building construction (falling sand method)
 JIS A 1453 Method of abrasion test for building materials and part of building construction (abrasive-paper method)
 JIS A 1509-5 Test methods for ceramic tiles -- Part 5: Determination of resistance to deep abrasion for unglazed floor tiles
 JIS A 1509-6 Test methods for ceramic tiles -- Part 6: Determination of resistance to surface abrasion for glazed floor tiles
 JIS C 60068-2 Environmental testing -- Part 2: Tests -- Test Xb: Abrasion of markings and letterings caused by rubbing of fingers and hands
 JIS H 8682-1 Test methods for abrasion resistance of anodic oxide coatings on aluminium and aluminium alloys -- Part 1: Wheel wear test
 JIS H 8682-2 Test methods for abrasion resistance of anodic oxide coatings on aluminium and aluminium alloys -- Part 2: Abrasive jet test
 JIS H 8682-3 Test methods for abrasion resistance of anodic oxide coatings on aluminium and aluminium alloys -- Part 3: Sand-falling abrasion resistance test
 JIS K 5600-5-8 Testing methods for paints -- Part 5: Mechanical property of film -- Section 8: Abrasion resistance (Rotating abrasive-paper-covered wheel method)
 JIS K 7204 Plastics -- Determination of resistance to wear by abrasive wheels

See also
 Abrasion (geology)
 Abrasive
 Abrasive blasting
 Archard equation
 Erosion
 Wear

References

Further reading
 “Wear Processes in Manufacturing”,  Badahur and Magee, ASTM STP 1362, 1999

Materials degradation
Tribology